The Frederica Historic District is a national historic district located at Frederica, Kent County, Delaware.  It encompasses 118 contributing buildings in the town of Frederica.  The oldest buildings date to the middle of the 18th century.  The district includes a number of 18th and 19th century commercial and residential buildings in a variety of popular architectural styles including Greek Revival, Italianate, and Federal.  Notable buildings include Trinity Methodist Church (1856), Robbins Hardware Store, the Hathorn House, Wootten Store, John Dill Store, Robert Dill House, firehouse, post office, and the Governor Hall House (1828, c. 1861), the home of Delaware Governor John W. Hall (1817-1892).

It was listed on the National Register of Historic Places in 1977.

References

External links

John Dill Store, 2 Market Street, Frederica, Kent County, DE: 3 photos, 8 data pages, and 1 photo caption page at Historic American Buildings Survey

Federal architecture in Delaware
Greek Revival architecture in Delaware
Italianate architecture in Delaware
Historic districts in Kent County, Delaware
Historic districts on the National Register of Historic Places in Delaware
National Register of Historic Places in Kent County, Delaware